Aksay (Yaxsay) is a rural locality (a selo) in Khasavyurtovsky District, Republic of Dagestan, Russia. The population was 9,000 as of 2010. There are 88 streets.

Geography 
Aksay is located 21 km northwest of Khasavyurt (the district's administrative centre) by road. Adzhimazhagatyurt is the nearest rural locality.

References 

Rural localities in Khasavyurtovsky District